Erotica are works that deal with erotically stimulating or arousing descriptions.

The term Erotica may also refer to:

Erotic art and entertainment
 Erotica (mural painting), depicting Love Poetry in the Literature series, Library of Congress Thomas Jefferson Building
 Erotica Expo, an annual adult entertainment convention held in Auckland, New Zealand
 Erotica UK, an annual adult entertainment convention held in London, England

Music

Albums
 Erotica (Madonna album), 1992
 Erotica (The Darling Buds album), 1992
 Erótica, a 1981 album by Uruguayan jazz harpist Roberto Perera
 Erotica, a 2006 album by Serbian turbo-folk singer Marta Savić
 Erotica, a 2010 album by Bulgarian pop-folk singer Kamelia

Songs
 "Erotica" (song), the first single from Madonna's album Erotica
 "Erotica", jazz composition by Herb Alpert
 "Erotica", composition for wind quintet by José Serebrier

See also